Smart Strike (foaled May 21, 1992 in Ontario – died March 25, 2015) was a Canadian Thoroughbred racehorse. The son of the Champion sire, Mr. Prospector, and out of the Canadian Horse Racing Hall of Fame mare Classy 'n Smart, Smart Strike is a half-brother to 1991 Canadian Triple Crown champion Dance Smartly.

Owned and bred by Sam-Son Farm, on the racetrack, Smart Strike's most important win came in the Grade I Philip H. Iselin Handicap. However, he was just developing into a top-flight horse when his career was cut short by injury.  He suffered a condylar fracture during a workout while preparing for the Breeders' Cup.

Stud record
Since he was retired to stud duty at Lane's End Farm in Versailles, Kentucky in 1997, Smart Strike's value as a stallion rose dramatically as a result of the performance of his offspring. Twice honored as the leading Sire in North America, he was the sire of 113 stakes winners, 12 champions, five Breeders' Cup winners, and two Classic victors. He has also found international success, both as a sire and broodmare sire, producing champions in several different countries.  
 Fleetstreet Dancer (b. 1998) - won Japan Cup Dirt
 Tenpins (b. 1998) - Philip H. Iselin Handicap
 Soaring Free (b. 1999) - Canadian Horse of the Year (2004), set North American record for 7 furlongs on turf
 Portcullis (b. 1999) - 2002 Champion Grass Horse in Canada
 Added Edge (b. 2000) - Canadian Champion 2-Year-Old Colt (2002)
 Eye of the Sphynx (b. 2001) - Canadian Champion 3-Year-Old Filly, dam of Eye of the Leopard
 English Channel (b. 2002) - American Champion Male Turf Horse (2007), multiple Grade 1 winner including the Breeders' Cup Turf
 Gold Strike (b. 2002) - wins included the Woodbine Oaks. Voted 2005 Canadian Champion 3-Year-Old Filly (2005). Dam of 2022 Kentucky Derby winner Rich Strike
 Fabulous Strike (b. 2003) -  earned a "huge" 118 Beyer Speed Figure in his first race of 2007  then won the Aristides Breeders' Cup Stakes
 Strike a Deal (b. 2004) - won the Laurel Futurity (2006), Straight Deal Stakes (2007)
 Curlin (b. 2004) - 2007 / 2008 American Horse of the Year, wins include Preakness Stakes, Breeders' Cup Classic, Dubai World Cup.
 Furthest Land (b. 2005) - winner of the 2009 Breeders' Cup Dirt Mile and Kentucky Cup Classic  
 Square Eddie (b. 2006) - won 2008 Breeders' Futurity Stakes, 2nd Breeders' Cup Juvenile 
 Papa Clem (b. 2006) - won 2009 Arkansas Derby 
 Lookin at Lucky (b. 2007) - at two, won three Grade 1 races. 2010 Champion Preakness Stakes Winner. Winner of over 2 million dollars at the age of 3. Voted 2009 American Champion Two-Year-Old Colt
 My Miss Aurelia (b. 2009) - undefeated as winner of the 2011 Breeders' Cup Juvenile Fillies
 Battle of Midway (b. 2014) - won the Breeders' Cup Dirt Mile, Affirmed Stakes, and Shared Belief Stakes. 3rd in 2017 Kentucky Derby

Damsire:
 Mine That Bird (b. 2006) - won 2009 Kentucky Derby
 Shared Account (b. 2006) - won 2010 Breeders' Cup Filly & Mare Turf
 Eye of the Leopard (b. 2006) - won 2009 Queen's Plate and Plate Trial Stakes
 First Dude (b. 2007) - won 2011 Hollywood Gold Cup, second in 2010 Preakness Stakes, Pennsylvania Derby, 3rd in 2010 Belmont Stakes 
 Inglorious (b. 2008) - won 2011 Queen's Plate, Woodbine Oaks, La Lorgnette Stakes 
 Dullahan (b. 2009) - won 2012 Pacific Classic Stakes, Blue Grass Stakes, 2011 Breeders' Futurity Stakes, half-brother to Mine That Bird
 Rich Strike (b. 2019) - won 2022 Kentucky Derby
 Stars on Earth (b. 2019) - won 2022 Oka Sho, Yushun Himba

Death and honors 
For his contribution to Thoroughbred racing, Smart Strike was inducted in the Canadian Horse Racing Hall of Fame in 2008.

While remarkably healthy and fertile until early 2015, Smart Strike was humanely euthanized on March 25, 2015 as a result of complications due to laminitis.

Pedigree

References

 Smart Strike's pedigree and racing stats
 TB Times Stallion Directory Smart Strike

External links
 Smart Strike Sought After

1992 racehorse births
2015 racehorse deaths
United States Champion Thoroughbred Sires
Racehorses bred in Canada
Racehorses trained in Canada
Canadian Horse Racing Hall of Fame inductees
Thoroughbred family 23-b
Chefs-de-Race